Barbara Guggenheim is the founder of the art consultancy firm Guggenheim, Asher Associates, Inc. The company, with offices in New York and Los Angeles, has been in business for more than 25 years. Barbara, together with Abigail Asher, has built collections for corporations including Coca-Cola and Sony, and numerous individuals, including celebrities Tom Cruise and Steven Spielberg. She holds a doctorate in Art History from Columbia University, has taught at the college level, lectured at the Whitney Museum, and has worked at the auction houses Sotheby's and Christie's.

Biography
Guggenehim was raised in Woodbury, New Jersey, the daughter of a dress-shop owner. She graduated with a Ph.D. in art history from Columbia University. She is the author of "Art World," a non-fiction study of the business of collecting art. She is also the author of "Little-Known Facts About Well-Known People," illustrated by Pamela Sztybel, "Decorating on Ebay: Fast and Stylish on a Budget," and "The Ultimate Organizer," co-written with Nadine Schiff. She currently lectures widely on all aspects of art and collecting as well as investing in art. Guggenheim has also contributed to W Magazine, Elle, and Harper's Bazaar. She is also a contributor to The Huffington Post and The Daily Beast.

She was married to the late entertainment attorney Bert Fields. They resided in New York and Los Angeles.

References

External links 
 Guggenheim, Asher, Associates, Inc.
 Barbara Guggenheim at Marmont Lane Books
 "Art World" by Barbara Guggenheim at Amazon
 "Little-Known Facts About Well-Known People" by Barbara Guggenheim at Amazon

Living people
American art historians
American women historians
Women art historians
Year of birth missing (living people)
Columbia University alumni
People from Woodbury, New Jersey
21st-century American women